The 2008–09 season was PFC CSKA Sofia's 61st consecutive season in A Group. This article shows player statistics and all matches (official and friendly) that the club have and will play during the 2008–09 season.

Players

Squad information 

Appearances for competitive matches only

|-
|colspan="14"|Players sold or loaned out after the start of the season:

|}

As of game played start of season

Players in/out

Summer transfers 

In:

Out:

Winter transfers 

In:

Out:

Pre-season and friendlies

Competitions

A Group

Table

Results summary

Results by round

Fixtures and results

Bulgarian Super Cup

Bulgarian Cup

See also 

PFC CSKA Sofia

External links
 Official Site

PFC CSKA Sofia seasons
Cska Sofia